Guarcino is a comune (municipality) in the Province of Frosinone in the Italian region Lazio, located about  east of Rome and about  north of Frosinone in the Monti Ernici area.

History
It is the ancient Varcenum of the Hernici, likely founded in the 8th century BC. After the Roman conquest and the fall of the Western Roman Empire, it was a free commune and later a fief in the Papal States. Pope Boniface VIII had a palace in the town.

References

External links
 Official website

Cities and towns in Lazio